News From Zoos is a Canadian children's television series which aired on CBC Television from 1980 to 1982.

Premise
This series was hosted by a chimpanzee named Charlie, voiced by Carl Banas who presented news features about animals. Episodes included reports from the Jackson Zoo, where a sable antelope was born, and from the San Francisco Zoo. Animals featured on the series included a Komodo dragon, Chinese giant pandas and a seawolf.

Scheduling
This half-hour series was broadcast on Mondays at 4:00 p.m. (Eastern) from 20 October 1980 to 25 May 1981. It was rebroadcast on Saturdays in the 1981 and 1982 seasons, and Friday afternoons in mid-1982.

References

External links
 
 

CBC Television original programming
1980 Canadian television series debuts
1982 Canadian television series endings
Television shows filmed in Toronto
1980s Canadian children's television series